The Grindavík men's basketball team, commonly known as Grindavík or UMFG for short, is the men's team of the basketball department of Ungmennafélag Grindavíkur multi-sport club, based in the town of Grindavík in Iceland.  It has won three national championships, in 1993, 2012 and 2013.

Recent history
In February 2020, Grindavík went to the Icelandic Cup Finals where it lost to Stjarnan.

Honors
Úrvalsdeild
 Winners (3): 1996, 2012, 2013

Icelandic Basketball Cup
 Winners (5): 1995, 1998, 2000, 2006, 2014

Company Cup
 Winners (3): 2000, 2009, 2011

Notable players

Head coaches
Managers since 1987:

Source

European record

References

Grindavík (basketball)